Simlapal is a census town in the Simlapal CD block in the Khatra subdivision of the Bankura district  in the state of West Bengal, India.

Geography

Location

Area overview
The map alongside shows the Khatra subdivision of Bankura district. Physiographically, this area is having uneven lands with hard rocks. In the Khatra CD block area there are some low hills. The Kangsabati project reservoir is prominently visible in the map. The subdued patches of shaded area in the map show forested areas. It is an almost fully rural area.

Note: The map alongside presents some of the notable locations in the subdivision. All places marked in the map are linked in the larger full screen map.

Demographics
According to the 2011 Indian Census, Simlapal had a total population of 7,206, of which 3,693 were males and 3,513 were females. Population within the age group of 0 to 6 years was 927. The total number of literates in Simlapal was 4,374, which constituted 60.7% of the population with male literacy of 67.2% and female literacy of 53.9%. The effective literacy rate of 7+ population of Simlapal was 69.7%, of which male literacy rate was 76.8% and female literacy rate was 62.1%. The Scheduled Castes and Scheduled Tribes population was 1,457 and 143 respectively. Simlapal had 1512 households in 2011.

.*For language details see Simlapal (community development block)#Language and religion

Civic administration

Police station
Simlapal police station has jurisdiction over the Simlapal  CD block. The area covered is 309.27  km2with a population of 127,429.

CD block HQ
The Simlapal Community Development Block headquarters located at behind Simlapal M M High School.

Infrastructure
According to the District Census Handbook 2011, Bankura, Simlapal covered an area of 4.0047 km2. Among the civic amenities, it had 12 km of roads with open drains, the protected water supply involved tap water from treated sources, hand pumps. It had 460 domestic electric connections, 60 road lighting points. Among the medical facilities it had 7 medicine shops. Among the educational facilities it had were 5 primary schools, 2 middle schools, 2 secondary schools, 2 senior secondary schools, the nearest general degree college at Baragari 11 km away. Among the social cultural and recreational facilities, it had 1 auditorium/ community hall, 1 public library, 1 reading room. The three most important commodities it manufactured were rice, brick, stone chips. It had the branches of 1 nationalised bank, 1 cooperative bank, 1 agricultural credit society.

Education
 Pandit Raghunath Murmu Smriti Mahavidyalaya was established at Baragari in 1986. The college is affiliated to the Bankura University, It offers honours courses in Bengali, Santali, English, Sanskrit, geography, history, political science, philosophy, computer science, mathematics, physics, chemistry, economics, forestry, and general courses in science and arts. It offers post-graduate courses in Bengali, Santali, Geo-Informatics, Geography and Rural Development & Planning.
 Simlapal College of Education is a private non-aided college offering a 1-year-course leading to the Bachelor of Education degree.
 Simlapal Madan Mohan High School, is a Bengali-medium educational institution established in 1938. It has facilities for teaching from class V to class XII. The school has 25 computers, a library with 2,100 books and a playground.
 Simlapal Mangalmoyee Balika Bidyamandir, is a Bengali-medium girls only institution established in 1986. It has facilities for teaching from class V to class XII. The school has 3 computers and a library with 300 books.

Healthcare
Simlapal Rural Hospital (Simlapal Block Primary Health Centre), with 30 beds at Simlapal, is the major government medical facility in the Simlapal CD block. There are primary health centres at Hatibari (Bon Dubrajpur) (with 4 beds), Lakshmisagar (Rasikpur) (with 10 beds), Arrah (with 6 beds).

References

Cities and towns in Bankura district